Stitched Up Heart is an American rock band on Another Century Records.  The band was formed in 2010 in Los Angeles by singer Alecia "Mixi" Demner. They have released two full-length albums and three EPs.

History

Early years, formation and early releases (2010–2015)
The group was founded in 2010 by vocalist Alecia 'Mixi' Demner, she would later recruit fellow guitarist Mikey Alfero and current New Years Day guitarist Nikki Misery with bassist David DiSarro and drummer Andrew Carroll the five-piece band would later release a self-titled EP on November 22, 2010, available by download only the EP featured "We're Alive" and "Is This the Way You Get to Hell?" they would release their second EP Escape the Nightmare in 2011.

After the release Alfero, Misery, and Carroll left the band in 2011 and were replaced by Merritt Goodwin and Nicky Warman who took over the roles of lead guitarist and rhythm guitarist respectively and are later joined by current drummer James Decker.

In 2012 the band went through another line up change after DiSarro, and Warman left the band, Warman was replaced by Grant Webb, who was then replaced by Luke Man and DiSarro was replaced by Randy Mathias.

As of 2013 Stitched Up Heart continued on as four-piece group following Luke Man's departure. On May 20, 2014, Stitched Up Heart released a new EP titled Skeleton Key. In 2015 Dorian Dolore joined the band as the new second guitarist, but would later be replaced by guitarist Nick Bedrosian in 2016.

Never Alone (2015–2017)
After several years spent developing their sound, recording demos and playing in local clubs, in 2015 Stitched Up Heart was signed to Another Century Records, a division of Century Label Group. A new single, "Finally Free," was released in late 2015 and eventually reached No. 19 in America's Active Rock Radio Chart. A follow-up single, "Monster," was unveiled April 29, 2016 and Billboard.com premiered the song “Event Horizon” on June 3, 2016. The band's major label debut, the album Never Alone was released on June 17, 2016, and debuted in the Top 10 of both the Billboard Heatseeker and Hard Rock charts.

In early 2017, the ensemble toured with American hard rock band Letters from the Fire.
After two months off the road, Stitched Up Heart headlined a sell-out concert at The Knitting Factory in Boise, Idaho on Friday April 21, 2017 promoted by local radio station 100.3 The X.

Darkness (2018–present)
In 2019 the band released the song "Lost" from their second album Darkness. It features vocals by Sully Erna of Godsmack.

Members
Alecia 'Mixi' Demner – lead vocals, rhythm guitar (2010–present)
James Decker – drums, backing vocals (2012–present)
Merritt Goodwin – lead guitar (2012–present)
Randy Mathias – bass, backing vocals (2014–present)

Former members

Mikey Alfero – lead guitar (2010–2011)
David DiSarro – bass (2010–2012)
Andrew Carroll – drums (2010–2011)
Dorian Dolore – rhythm guitar (2015–2016)
Nikki Misery – lead guitar (2010–2011)
Nicky Warman – rhythm guitar (2012)
Luke Man  – lead guitar (2013)
Grant Webb – lead guitar (2012–2013)
Nick Bedrosian – rhythm guitar, backing vocals (2016–2019)
Source:

Discography

Studio albums
 Never Alone (2016) 
Darkness (2020)

EPs
 Stitched Up Heart (2010)
 Escape the Nightmare (2011)
 Skeleton Key (2014)

Singles

Music videos

References

External links
StitchedUpHeart.org
AnotherCentury.com

2010 establishments in California
Another Century Records artists
Hard rock musical groups from California
Musical groups established in 2010
Musical groups from Los Angeles
Musical quartets
Female-fronted musical groups